Sir Patrick de Graham of Kincardine (c. 1235 – 27 April 1296) was a 13th-century Scottish noble and soldier.

Patrick was born around 1235, the son of David Graham of Dundaff. He was selected to negotiate the marriage of Prince Alexander of Scotland and Margaret of Flanders in 1281. He sat in the Parliament of 1284 and acknowledged Margaret, Maid of Norway as heir to the throne of Scotland.

He was Sheriff of Stirling by 1289 and was one of John Balliol's auditors in 1292 during the competition for the Scottish crown. Patrick swore fealty to King Edward I of England in 1292. He served Edward I in France in 1294. He died at the Battle of Dunbar in 1296.

Family and issue
Patrick married Annabella, widow of John of Restalrig, the daughter of Robert, Earl of Strathearn and had the following known issue:
David of Kincardine and Old Montrose, had issue.
Patrick of Kincardine, married Euphemia Stewart, Countess of Strathearn, had issue.
John of Abercorn, married Mary Menteith, Countess of Menteith, had issue.
Margaret, married firstly Hugh, Earl of Ross, and secondly John de Berkeley of Gartley, had issue.

References

13th-century Scottish people
Medieval Scottish knights
Scottish deaths at the Battle of Dunbar (1296)
Patrick